Anolis fowleri, the green-banded anole or Fowler's anole, is a rare species of lizard in the family Dactyloidae. The species is endemic to the Dominican Republic.

References

Anoles
Reptiles described in 1973
Endemic fauna of the Dominican Republic
Reptiles of the Dominican Republic
Taxa named by Albert Schwartz (zoologist)